Henry Chamberlin (31 July 1825 – 12 April 1888), in many sources referred to as Chamberlain, was a member of the New Zealand Legislative Council. He came to New Zealand in his late 20s with a younger brother and a lot of capital, which he invested in land south and west of Auckland. After a failed attempt to win election to the House of Representatives in 1867, he was called to the Legislative Council in early 1869. He remained a member until his accidental drowning in 1888.

Early life and family

Chamberlin was born at Narborough Hall in Narborough, Norfolk on 31 July 1825 and baptised on 7 August, one of ten children of Hannah Chamberlin (1799–1863) and Henry Chamberlin (1773–1848). He had one elder sister and eight younger siblings.

After some years in New Zealand, Chamberlin returned to England in the late 1850s to marry Elizabeth Catherine Heard (1841–1929) at St Mary and St Peter's Church in Kelsale, Suffolk in November 1859. They had one daughter, Eva Ellen Chamberlin, born in 1861.

Life in New Zealand
Chamberlin and his younger brother Charles (1829–1878) came to Auckland in 1853; Chamberlin had about £20,000 when he immigrated and he invested mostly in land, much of it in the Raglan, Drury, and Hobsonville areas. One of his first purchases was at Ōpaheke in 1853. Ponui Island, also known as Chamberlin's Island, belonged to his brother Charles.

In the 1860s, Chamberlin was a trustee of the Hunua Highway Board. When Joseph Newman resigned his membership in the House of Representatives for the Raglan electorate, Chamberlin was one of three candidates contesting the 1867 Raglan by-election. Chamberlin was nominated by Reader Wood but came last, getting 10% of the vote. During the premiership of Edward Stafford, Chamberlin was called to the New Zealand Legislative Council, effective from 8 February 1869. Appointments at the time were for life and he held membership until his death.

Death
Chamberlin fell into a hole on his Drury property and drowned; he had long been prospecting on his land for coal and had recently dug the trench in which he drowned. The inquest was held on 16 April at the Railway Hotel in Drury. The intention was for him to be buried at St Stephen's Chapel but the graveyard had been restricted for family burials, and his body was interred at St Thomas' Cemetery in Kohimarama instead. The funeral was attended by Frederick Whitaker, William Pollock Moat, and Frederick Moss.

His wife died in October 1929 and his daughter in November 1938.

References  

1825 births
1888 deaths
Members of the New Zealand Legislative Council
Deaths by drowning in New Zealand
Accidental deaths in New Zealand
People from Breckland District
People from Auckland
Burials in New Zealand